Colin Benedict Curtis (born February 1, 1985) is an American former professional baseball outfielder. In 2010, he played for the New York Yankees of Major League Baseball (MLB).

Amateur career
Curtis attended Issaquah High School, where he played baseball for the school. As a freshman, in 2000, Issaquah won the Class 3A state championship. Curtis was named to the All-King County Class 3A team in 2001, 2002, and 2003. He was named to the All-State team in 2002 and 2003.

Curtis was chosen in the 50th round of the 2003 Major League Baseball Draft by the Cincinnati Reds, but he did not sign, choosing to attend Arizona State University to play college baseball for the Arizona State Sun Devils baseball team. In 2004 and 2005, he played collegiate summer baseball for the Orleans Cardinals of the Cape Cod Baseball League, and was named the MVP of the East division team at the league's annual all-star game in 2005.

Professional career

Draft and Minor Leagues
The New York Yankees selected Curtis in the fourth round of the 2006 Major League Baseball Draft. Curtis was a 2010 spring training non-roster invitee for the Yankees.

New York Yankees (2010-2012)
Curtis was called up to the major leagues on June 21, 2010. That night he pinch hit for A. J. Burnett in the 5th inning, and flied out to center field on a 1-2 pitch, for the second out of the inning. On June 22, 2010, Curtis recorded his first major league hit, a double off of Chad Qualls of the Arizona Diamondbacks.

On July 21, 2010, he hit his first career home run against Scot Shields of the Los Angeles Angels of Anaheim when he was called upon to pinch hit when Brett Gardner was ejected from a game while batting with an 0-2 count in the bottom of the seventh inning.

On July 31, 2010 Curtis was optioned back to the Yankees AAA affiliate the Scranton/Wilkes-Barre Yankees following the acquisition of outfielder Austin Kearns by the Yankees.  He was promoted again on September 6 and was part of the Yankees postseason roster until the team lost to the Texas Rangers in the 2010 ALCS.

During Spring Training of 2011, Colin Curtis was placed on the 60-day disabled list due to a shoulder injury. On April 15, 2011, he underwent right shoulder surgery and missed the entire 2011 season. Curtis was released by the Yankees on August 1, 2012.

Somerset Patriots (2012)
Curtis signed with the Somerset Patriots of the independent Atlantic League of Professional Baseball a few days after he was released by the Yankees. He has not played professional baseball since the end of the 2012 season.

Personal
During his freshman year of high school, at the age of 15, Curtis was diagnosed with testicular cancer. It spread to the veins in his stomach and around his lymph nodes. The treatment involved surgery to remove the tumor and parts of the affected veins and regular blood tests. While battling the disease, fellow testicular cancer survivor Lance Armstrong gave him an autographed book.

References

External links

Baseball America profile

1985 births
Living people
New York Yankees players
Arizona State Sun Devils baseball players
Orleans Firebirds players
Major League Baseball left fielders
Major League Baseball right fielders
People from Issaquah, Washington
Gulf Coast Yankees players
Staten Island Yankees players
Trenton Thunder players
Tampa Yankees players
Scranton/Wilkes-Barre Yankees players
Baseball players from Washington (state)
Somerset Patriots players
Sportspeople from King County, Washington